Max Ryan (born 2 January 1967 in the North of England) is a British actor and former motocross racer. After a near-death experience in motocross he eventually turned to acting. After some lesser supporting roles in famous British soap operas and a resident personality on a popular 1990s British game show, The Price is Right, he landed a role in the Jet Li action film Kiss of the Dragon. His performance led to other opportunities such as co-starring with Steven Seagal as the main villain in The Foreigner as well as appearing in Sean Connery's The League of Extraordinary Gentlemen. Later roles include a villain in Jason Statham's Death Race and a supporting role in Sex and the City 2.

Filmography

References

External links
 

English male film actors
Living people
1967 births